Nationality words link to articles with information on the nation's poetry or literature (for instance, Irish or France).

Events
 Forward Poetry Prize created
 Dana Gioia, writing in The Atlantic Monthly suggests (in an article titled "Can Poetry Matter?") that poets recite the works of other poets at public readings.
 Joseph Brodsky, the United States poet laureate, suggests in The New Republic that an anthology of American poetry be put beside the Bible and telephone directory in every hotel room in the country.

Works published in English
Listed by nation where the work was first published and again by the poet's native land, if different; substantially revised works listed separately:

Australia
 Les Murray, The Rabbiter's Bounty

Anthologies in Australia
 Philip Mead and John Tranter, The Penguin Book of Modern Australian Poetry a major anthology of Twentieth century poetry from that nation
 Les Murray, editor, The New Oxford Book of Australian Verse (editor), Melbourne, Oxford University Press, 1986 and Oxford, Oxford University Press, 1991, 1999

Canada
 Margaret Avison, Selected Poems Canada
 Earle Birney, Last Makings: Poems. Toronto: McClelland & Stewart.
 Don Domanski, Wolf-Ladder (nominated for a Governor General's Award)
 Jeffery Donaldson, Once out of Nature, McClelland & Stewart.
 Louis Dudek, Europe. Erin, ON: Porcupine's Quill, 1991.
 Louis Dudek, Small Perfect Things. Montreal: DC Books.
 Robert Finch, Miracle at the Jetty. Port Rowan, ON: Leeboard Press.
 Dorothy Livesay, The Woman I Am. Montreal: Guernica.
 Laura Lush, Hometown, Montreal: Vehicle Press.
 Anne Marriott, Aqua, Toronto: Wolsak & Wynn.
 Don McKay, Night Field (Canada)
 Roy Miki, In Saving Face: Poems Selected, 1976-1988, Canada
 P. K. Page, The Glass Air: Selected Poems (an expanded edition; original edition published in 1985)
 John Pass, The Hour's Acropolis, shortlisted for the 1993 Dorothy Livesay Poetry Prize, 
 Raymond Souster, 'Running Out the Clock. Ottawa: Oberon Press.
 George Woodcock, Tolstoy at Yasnaya Polyana & other Poems, Kingston: Quarry Press, Canada

India, in English
 Gieve Patel, Mirrored, Mirroring ( Poetry in English ), Oxford University Press, New Delhi
 Sujata Bhatt, Monkey Shadows ( Poetry in English ), received a Poetry Book Society Recommendation; Carcanet Press
 Ranjit Hoskote, Zones of Assault ( Poetry in English ), New Delhi: Rupa & Co., 
 Sudeep Sen:
 Kali in Ottava Rima, Paramount, London, 1992; Rupa, New Delhi, 1991, 
 New York Times, New Delhi: Rupa,  (reprinted in 1993, London: The Many Press)
 Dilip Chitre, Travelling in a CageIreland
 Brian Coffey, Poems and Versions 1929–1990, including "Death of Hektor" and "For What for Whom Unwanted"
 Gerald Dawe, Sunday School, Oldcastle: The Gallery Press, 
 Paul Durcan, Crazy About Women, including "The Levite and His Concubine at Gibeah"
 Eamon Grennan, As If It Matters, including "Breaking Points", Oldcastle: The Gallery Press
 John Hewitt, Collected Poems, Belfast: The Blackstaff Press
 Michael Longley:
 Gorse Fires, including "Between Hovers", "Laertes", "Argos" and "The Butchers"
 Poems 1963–1983, including "In memoriam", "Caravan", "Wounds", "Ghost Town", "Man Lying on a Wall", "Wreaths", "Mayo Monologues" and "The Linen Industry"
 Thomas McGreevy, Collected Poems, including "Homage to Hieronymous Bosch" and "Recessional"
 Medbh McGuckian, Marconi's Cottage, Oldcastle: The Gallery Press
 Paula Meehan, The Man Who Was Marked by Winter, "The Pattern" and "Child Burial", Oldcastle: The Gallery Press
 Bernard O'Donoghue, The Weakness, including "A Nun Takes the Veil" and "The Weakness", Chatto and Windus
 Peter Sirr, Ways of Falling, including "A Few Helpful Hints", Oldcastle: The Gallery Press

New Zealand
 Fleur Adcock (New Zealand poet who moved to England in 1963):Time-zones, Oxford and New York: Oxford University PressSelected Poems, Oxford and New York: Oxford University Press
 Jenny Bornholdt, Waiting Shelter, New Zealand
 Alan Brunton, Slow Passes 1978–1988 Lauris Edmond, New and Selected Poems, Auckland: Oxford University Press
 Michele Leggott, Swimmers, Dancers, Auckland : Auckland University Press
 Bill Manhire, Milky Way Bar, New Zealand
 Bob Orr, BreezeUnited Kingdom
 Dannie Abse, There Was a Young Man From Cardiff, autobiography
 Fleur Adcock (New Zealand poet who moved to England in 1963):Time-zones, Oxford and New York: Oxford University PressSelected Poems, Oxford and New York: Oxford University Press
 W. H. Auden, Collected Poems George Mackay Brown, Selected Poems 1954–1983 Wendy Cope, Serious Concerns Paul Durcan, Crazy About Women Gavin Ewart, Collected Poems 1980–1991 John Fuller, The Mechanical Body Lavinia Greenlaw, The Cost of Getting Lost in Space Philip Gross, The Son of the Duke of Nowhere Michael Hamburger, Roots in the Air Tony Harrison, A Cold Coming Seamus Heaney:
 Seeing Things, Faber & Faber
 Squarings, Hieroglyph Editions
 Paul Henry, Time Pieces, Seren
 Linton Kwesi Johnson, Tings an' Times P. J. Kavanagh, An Enchantment Jackie Kay, The Adoption Papers Thomas Kinsella, Madonna, and Other Poems Kenneth Koch, Selected Poems, Manchester: Carcanet, American poet's book published in the United Kingdom
 Liz Lochhead, Bagpipe Muzak Michael Longley, Gorse Fires George MacBeth, Trespassing Medbh McGukian, Marconi's Cottage Jamie McKendrick, The Sirocco Room Derek Mahon, Selected Poems. Viking
 Edwin Morgan, Hold Hands Among the Atoms Andrew Motion, Love in a Life Sean O'Brien, HMS Glasshouse, Oxford University Press
 Christopher Reid, In the Echoey Tunnel C. H. Sisson, Antidotes Gerard Woodward, HouseholderUnited States
 Arnold Adoff – In for Winter, Out for Spring John Ashbery, Flow Chart Gwendolyn Brooks, Children Coming Home Robert Creeley, Selected Poems 1945-90 Billy Collins, Questions About Angels, the winner of the National Poetry Series competition in 1993
 Paul Hoover, The Novel: A Poem (New Directions)
 Howard Nemerov, Trying Conclusions: New and Selected Poems, 1961-1991 (University of Chicago Press)
 Grace Paley, Long Walks and Intimate Talks (stories and poems)
 Kenneth Rexroth, Flower Wreath Hill: Later Poems Eleanor Ross Taylor, Days Going/Days Coming BackPoets represented in The Best American Poetry 1991 anthology
These 75 poets were represented in The Best American Poetry 1991 edited by David Lehman, with guest editor Mark Strand:

Johnathon Aaron
Ai
Dick Allen
Julia Alvarez
John Ash
John Ashbery
George Bradley
Joseph Brodsky
Gerald Burns
Amy Clampitt
Marc Cohen
Alfred Corn
Stephen Dobyns
Stephen Dunn
Carolyn Forche

Alice Fulton
Louise Glück
Jorie Graham
Melissa Green
Debora Greger
Linda Gregerson
Allen Grossman
Thom Gunn
Donald Hall
Brooks Haxton
Daniel Hoffman
John Hollander
Paul Hoover
Ron Horning
Richard Howard

Josephine Jacobsen
Donald Justice
Vickie Karp
Robert Kelly
Jane Kenyon
Karl Kirchwey
Carolyn Kizer
Kenneth Koch
John Koethe
Mark Levine
Laurence Lieberman
Elizabeth Macklin
J. D. McClatchy
James McManus
James Merrill

Susan Mitchell
Gary Mitchner
A. F. Moritz
Thylias Moss
Joyce Carol Oates
Bob Perelman
Robert Polito
Katha Pollitt
Susan Prospere
Jack Roberts
Sherod Santos
Lloyd Schwartz
Robyn Selman
David Shapiro
Laurie Sheck

Charles Simic
David R. Slavitt
Charlie Smith
Elizabeth Spires
David St. John
Ruth Stone
Patricia Storace
James Tate
Molly Tenenbaum
David Trinidad
Chase Twichell
Derek Walcott
Rosanna Warren
Susan Wheeler
Charles Wright

Criticism, scholarship and biography in the United States
 William Meredith, Poems Are Hard to Read, criticism
 Jacqueline Vaught Brogan, Part of the Climate: American Cubist Poetry, University of California Press, scholarship
M.L. Rosenthal, Our Life in Poetry, collection of literary criticism, including the influential "Poetry as Confession", an article appearing in 1959 in which Rosenthall coined the term "confessional" as used in Confessional poetry

Works published in other languages

Denmark
 Naja Marie Aidt. Så længe jeg er ung ("As Long as I’m Young"), first volume of a poetic trilogy which includes Et Vanskeligt mode ("A Difficult Encounter") 1992, and Det tredje landskap ("The Third Landscape") 1994
 Inger Christensen, Butterfly Valley: A Requiem (Sommerfugledalen), poems (later translated into English by Susanna Nied)
 Klaus Høeck, Salme, publisher: Brøndum
 Søren Ulrik Thomsen, HjemfaldenFrance
 Yves Bonnefoy:
 Début et fin de neige Là où retombe la flèche Claude Esteban, Soleil dans une pièce vide, Flammarion

India
Listed in alphabetical order by first name:
 K. Siva Reddy, Sivareddy Kavita, Hyderabad: Jhari Poetry Circle, Telugu-language
 Mallika Sengupta, Haghare O Debdasi, Kolkata: Prativas Publication; Bengali-language
 Nirendranath Chakravarti, Aay Rongo, Kolkata: Ananda Publishers; Bengali-language
 Prathibha Nandakumar, Rasteyanchina gaadi ("Cart at the Edge of the Road"), Bangalore: Kannada Sangha, Christ College; Kannada-language
 Rajendra Kishore Panda, Bahubreehi, Jharsuguda: Soubhagya Manjari, Jharsuguda, Oraya-language

Poland
 Stanisław Barańczak, Biografioly: poczet 56 jednostek slawnych, slawetnych i oslawionych ("Biographies of 56 Celebrated, Famous or Notorious Individuals"), light verse; Poznan: a5
 Stanisław Barańczak, Zwierzeca zajadlosc: z zapiskow zniecheconego zoologa ("Animal Ferocity: From the Notes of a Discouraged Zoologist"), light verse; Poznan: a5
 Czesław Miłosz, Dalsze okolice ("Farther Surroundings"); Kraków: Znak
 Tadeusz Różewicz, Płaskorzeźba ("Bas-Relief"), Wrocław: Wydawnictwo Dolnośląskie
 Jan Twardowski, Uśmiech Pana Boga. Wiersze dla dzieci ("The Smile of God: Poems for Children"), Warsaw: Nasza Księgarnia

Spain
 Matilde Camus, Tierra de mi Cantabria ("Cantabria, my land")

Other languages
 Emperor Akihito and Empress Michiko, Tomoshibi ("Light"), Japan, with English translations
 Mario Benedetti, Las soledades de Babel ("The Loneliness of Babel"), Uruguay
 Odysseus Elytis, The Elegies of Oxopetras (Τα Ελεγεία της Οξώπετρας) Ndoc Gjetja, Kthimet ("Returns"); Albania
 Alexander Mezhirov, Избранное ("Favorite"), Russia
 Eugenio Montale, Tutte le poesie, edited by Giorgio Zampa. Jonathan Galassi in 1998 called this book the "most comprehensive edition of Montale's poems"; posthumously published; Italy
 Nizar Qabbani, Syrian, Arabic-language poet:
 Do You Hear the Cry of My Sadness? Marginal Notes on the Book of Defeat Rami Saari, Gvarim Ba-tzomet ("Men at the Crossroad"), Israeli writing in Hebrew

Awards and honors

Australia
 C. J. Dennis Prize for Poetry: Jennifer Maiden, The Winter Baby Kenneth Slessor Prize for Poetry: Jennifer Maiden, The Winter Baby Mary Gilmore Prize: Jean Kent - VerandahsCanada
 Gerald Lampert Award: Diana Brebner, Radiant Life Forms Archibald Lampman Award: George Elliott Clarke, Whylah Falls 1991 Governor General's Awards: Don McKay, Night Field (English); Madeleine Gagnon, Chant pour un Québec lointain (French)
 Pat Lowther Award: Karen Connelly, The Small Words in My Body Prix Alain-Grandbois: Jacques Brault, Il n'y a plus de chemin Dorothy Livesay Poetry Prize: Jeff Derksen, Down Time Prix Émile-Nelligan: Rachel Leclerc, Les Vies frontalièresIndia
 Sahitya Akademi Award : Girija Kumar Mathur for Main Vakt ke Hoon Samne Poetry Society India National Poetry Competition : Rajlukshmee Debee Bhattacharya for Punarnava

United Kingdom
 Cholmondeley Award: James Berry, Sujata Bhatt, Michael Hulse, Derek Mahon
 Eric Gregory Award: Roddy Lumsden, Glyn Maxwell, Stephen Smith, Wayne Burrows, Jackie Kay
 Queen's Gold Medal for Poetry: Judith Wright
 Whitbread Award for poetry (United Kingdom): Michael Longley, Gorse Fires National Poetry Competition : John Levett for A Shrunken HeadUnited States
 Agnes Lynch Starrett Poetry Prize: Julia Kasdorf, Sleeping Preacher Aiken Taylor Award for Modern American Poetry: John Frederick Nims
 AML Award for poetry Philip White for "Island Spring"
 American Academy of Arts and Letters Gold Medal in Poetry, Richard Wilbur
 Bernard F. Connors Prize for Poetry: Donald Hall, "Museum of Clear Ideas"
 Bollingen Prize: Laura Riding Jackson and Donald Justice
 Frost Medal: Donald Hall
 National Book Award for poetry: Philip Levine, What Work Is Poet Laureate Consultant in Poetry to the Library of Congress: Joseph Brodsky
 Pulitzer Prize for Poetry: Mona Van Duyn: Near Changes''
 Ruth Lilly Poetry Prize: David Wagoner
 Whiting Awards: Thylias Moss, Franz Wright
 Fellowship of the Academy of American Poets: J. D. McClatchy

Births
 January 14 – George the Poet (George Mpanga), English spoken word artist

Deaths
Birth years link to the corresponding "[year] in poetry" article:
 January 5 – Vasko Popa (born 1921), Serbian poet
 January 22 – Robert Choquette (born 1905), Canadian novelist and poet
 January 29 – John Glassco (born 1909), Canadian poet, memoirist and novelist
 February 21 – Dorothy Auchterlonie (born 1915), Australian poet, academic and literary critic
 March 10 – Etheridge Knight (born 1931), American poet
 March 22 – Paul Engle (born 1908), American poet, writer, editor, and novelist
 April 7 – R. F. Brissenden (born 1928), Australian poet, novelist, critic and academic
 April 12 – James Schuyler, 67, American poet and a central figure in the New York School, of a stroke
 June 22 – George Thaniel (born 1938), Canadian poet
 July 5 – Howard Nemerov, 71, former U.S. Poet Laureate, of cancer
 September 2 – Laura Riding Jackson, 90, American poet and writer, of a heart attack
 September 24 – Dr. Seuss, 87, American author of children's verse
 September 27 – Roy Fuller (born 1912), English poet and writer
 October 11 – Steven "Jesse" Bernstein (born 1950), American performance poet, suicide
 October 27 – George Barker (born 1913), English poet
 December 14 – John Arlott (born 1914), English cricket commentator and poet
 Also – Clementina Suárez (born 1902), Honduran poet

See also

Poetry
List of years in poetry
List of poetry awards

Notes

20th-century poetry
Poetry